is a compilation album released by An Cafe on December 9, 2009 in Japan. This was made after An Cafe decided their hiatus and is an album featuring all of their best songs plus an unreleased song "Nijikan Shabondama". The album peaked at No. 18 on the Japanese albums chart.

Track listing

References

An Cafe albums
2009 albums